François Rollier (1915–1992), was as a french lawyer who joined the Michelin company in 1956. He was a leading director of Michelin between 1966 and 1991 alongside his cousin, François Michelin and, from 1986, René Zingraff.  
  
On 24 June 1970 Rollier became chairman of Citroën, an automobile manufacturer and leading customer of the Michelin tire company in the 1930s. Citroën had run out of cash, and thereby been acquired by the tire supplier to which it was at the time heavily indebted. Rollier became Citroën Chairman at a time when the company had recently plugged an open gap in its range with the launch of the Citroën GS and was consequently seen by Rollier and others to be at the start of a trajectory towards profitability. The oil price shock of the early 1970s would see the company returning to heavy losses and Michelin ceding control over it to rival auto-maker Peugeot in 1975.

Rollier retired in 1991, and was replaced at the helm of Michelin by Édouard Michelin.

François Rollier was the father of another Michelin director and board member, Michel Rollier (2006- 2021)   and of Philippe Rollier, CEO of Lafarge North America.

Sources and further reading

External links
  Michelin genealogy

1915 births
20th-century French businesspeople
Michelin people
1992 deaths